Émilie Bacquet (born 20 April 1984) is a French former professional tennis player.

Her career-high WTA rankings are 413 in singles, achieved on 10 July 2006, and 254 in doubles, set on 19 July 2010.

ITF finals

Singles (0–4)

Doubles (12–12)

References

External links
 
 

1984 births
Living people
French female tennis players